White Bay is a large bay in Newfoundland, Canada.

Bays of Newfoundland and Labrador